Franco Nenci (27 January 1935 – 15 May 2020) was an Italian welterweight boxer. Nenci represented Italy at the 1956 Melbourne Olympic Games, winning a silver medal as a Light Welterweight.

Olympic results 
Round of 32: Defeated Rehmat Gul (Pakistan) KO 3
Round of 16: Defeated Willi Roth (United Team of Germany) points
Quarterfinal: Defeated Antonio Marcilla (Argentina) points
Semifinal: Defeated Constantin Dumitrescu (Romania) points
Final: Lost to Vladimir Yengibaryan (Soviet Union) points (was awarded silver medal)

References

External links
 

1935 births
2020 deaths
Sportspeople from Livorno
Boxers at the 1956 Summer Olympics
Olympic boxers of Italy
Olympic silver medalists for Italy
Olympic medalists in boxing
Italian male boxers
Medalists at the 1956 Summer Olympics
Light-welterweight boxers
20th-century Italian people